Gwynn ap Gwilym (1950 – 31 July 2016) was a Welsh poet, novelist, editor and translator.

He was born in Bangor but raised in Machynlleth, in Gwynedd, north-west Wales. He was educated at University of Wales, University College, Galway and Wycliffe Hall, Oxford, with an MA degree.

An Anglican clergyman, he was also a lecturer at the University of Wales, Aberystwyth. He was Parish rector of the Upper Dyfi Valley (churches Mallwyd, Cemaes Bay, Llanymawddwy, Darowen and Llanbrynmair). He lectured part-time at the former United Theological College Aberystwyth.

In 1983 he won the Welsh Arts Council prize for his volume of poetry, "Grassholm", and in 1986 he was Poet Chair at the National Eisteddfod in Fishguard for his ode, "The Cloud".

Gwilym died on 31 July 2016 from cancer.

Works
 Eisteddfota, C. Davis, 1979, 
 Gwales, Gwasg Gwynedd, 1983, 
 Yr Ymyl Aur (1997)
 Dydd Oedd a Diwedd Iddo (2002)
 Cyfres o Esboniadau: Llyfr Deuteronomium (2002)

Editor
 Blodeugerdd o farddoniaeth Gymraeg yr ugeinfed ganrif, editors Gwynn ap Gwilym, Alan Llwyd, Gomer, 1987,

References

External links
"Gwynn ap Gwilym: Bardd a nofelydd", BBC, Gorffennaf 25, 2002

1955 births 
2016 deaths
People from Machynlleth
Academics of Aberystwyth University
Alumni of the University of Galway
Alumni of Wycliffe Hall, Oxford
Welsh-language writers
Welsh-language poets
Welsh male novelists
Crowned bards
People from Gwynedd